General elections were held in Japan on 15 February 1892 to elect the members of the House of Representatives of the Diet of Japan.

Background
After the 1890 general elections for the lower house of the Diet of Japan, the elected members proved much less amenable to government persuasion than had been anticipated by Itō Hirobumi and other members of the Meiji oligarchy. Rather than docilely rubber stamp legislation issued from the House of Peers and the genrō, the leaders of the lower house used the only leverage granted to them under the Meiji Constitution, withholding budgetary approval, to show resistance. This stalemate led to earlier-than-anticipated dissolution of the government and new elections. Emperor Meiji expressed concern that if the same people were elected again, the same problem would recur, and suggested that regional offices encourage good people to run for office.

Home Minister Shinagawa Yajirō interpreted this as a condemnation of political party activity, and sent memorandums to all regional government offices encouraging the dismissal of men deeply involved in political party activity. He also instructed the police to deal severely with any acts of bribery and intimidation. However, the elections became the most violent in Japanese history, with numerous riots, in which 25 people were killed and 388 wounded. Violence was particularly severe in areas of the country with strong support for the opposition Liberal Party. Encouraged by Prime Minister Matsukata Masayoshi, Shinagawa arrested candidates he deemed "disloyal", and had gangs of toughs molest voters and burn opposition politicians' property. Prefectural governors and police chiefs were secretly ordered to disrupt campaigns of "disloyal" opposition politicians and to aid pro-government supporters. Ballot boxes were stolen in Kōchi Prefecture, and voting was made impossible in parts of Saga Prefecture; violations were most conspicuous in these two prefectures, Ishikawa and Fukuoka.

Electoral system
As with the 1890 elections, the electorate was based on limited suffrage, with only male citizens 25 years of age and over, who had paid 15 Yen or more in national taxes, and who had been resident in their prefecture for at least a year, qualified to vote. The number of eligible voters who met this requirement was 434,594. The number of candidates for office was 900.

Results
Despite the violence, the mintō (liberal parties) – the Liberal Party, Rikken Kaishintō and their affiliates) maintained a plurality in the House of Representatives, winning 132 seats as opposed to 124 for pro-government candidates, with 44 independents.

Post-election composition by prefecture

Aftermath
The government faced an angry lower house when the next Diet term convened on 6 May; even members of the House of Peers were outraged, issuing a resolution condemning the manner in which the elections had been held on 11 May. Shinagawa was forced to resign the following month.

Notes

References

 ; OCLC 46731178

Politics of the Empire of Japan
General elections in Japan
Japan
General election
February 1892 events
Election and referendum articles with incomplete results